The Database for Bacterial Group II Introns is a repository of full-length, non-redundant group II introns present in bacterial DNA sequence. The database is first established in 2002 with roughly 40 introns. In less than 10 years, the database has expanded to 400 introns. Current database includes a wealth of information on the properties, structures, and classification of group II intron. In addition, it contains a list of intron insertion sites, DNA sequences, protein-encoding sequences, as well as RNA secondary structures.

See also
 group II intron

References

External links
 https://web.archive.org/web/20120425142811/http://webapps2.ucalgary.ca/~groupii/index.html

Biological databases
RNA
Ribozymes
RNA splicing